Another Day/Another Dollar is a 12" vinyl EP by Gang of Four, released in 1982 in the US, by Warner Bros. Records. The release is a compilation of material previously unreleased in the US. The first two tracks were released in the UK as a single. The third track is the b-side of the UK only single "What We All Want," and the last two tracks are excerpted from a live show recorded at the Hammersmith Palais, in London, on 3/30/81. All five songs from the EP later appeared on the EMI Records and Infinite Zero Archive/American Recordings's 1995 CD reissue of the 1981 LP Solid Gold.

Track listing 

All tracks written by Dave Allen, Hugo Burnham, Andy Gill and Jon King except as indicated.

 "To Hell With Poverty!" – 4:59
 "Capital (It Fails Us Now)" (Gill) – 4:04
 "History's Bunk!" (Gill, King) – 2:59
 "Cheeseburger" (Live) – 3:40 
 "What We All Want" (Live) – 5:24

Personnel 
 Dave Allen - bass guitar, vocals
 Hugo Burnham - drums, vocals
 Andy Gill - guitar, vocals
 Jon King - vocals

Notes

Charts 
Album

Single

Gang of Four (band) albums
1982 EPs